Alvin Philip Adams Jr. (August 29, 1942 – October 10, 2015) was an American diplomat.

Biography
Born in New York City, he was one of three children born to Elizabeth Miller, daughter of Nathan L. Miller, and Alvin P. Adams Sr. His father was a Western Airlines executive. His mother owned a bookstore. The younger Adams attended Yale, like his father, and received a J.D. from Vanderbilt University Law School.

Adams joined the Foreign Service in 1967 and was appointed as the United States Ambassador to Djibouti in 1983 where he served until 1985. His next ambassadorship was to Haiti, where he convinced Prosper Avril to relinquish power in a late night conversation held in March 1990. In 1992, Adams was named ambassador to Peru, serving in that post until his retirement from the Foreign Service in 1996.

Adams also worked in Washington, D.C., for what became the Bureau of Counterterrorism before his Haiti stint and was posted in Vietnam prior to all ambassadorial assignments. There, he met his wife, Mai-Anh Nguyen. Before their divorce, they had two sons, Lex and Tung Thanh, who died in the 1989 USS Iowa turret explosion. Adams lived in Buenos Aires and Honolulu, then moved to Portland, Oregon in 2011, where he died on October 10, 2015, aged 73.

References

External links

 

1942 births
2015 deaths
People from New York City
Yale University alumni
Vanderbilt University Law School alumni
Ambassadors of the United States to Djibouti
Ambassadors of the United States to Haiti
Ambassadors of the United States to Peru
People from Portland, Oregon
American expatriates in Argentina
American expatriates in Vietnam
United States Foreign Service personnel
20th-century American diplomats